Ştiubei may refer to several places in Romania:

 Ştiubei, a village in Râmnicelu Commune, Buzău County
 Ştiubei, a village in Vela Commune, Dolj County